Tiryan-Yelga (Täränyılğa) is a rural locality (a village) in Tatar-Ulkanovsky Selsoviet, Tuymazinsky District, Bashkortostan, Russia. The population was 189 as of 2010. There is 1 street.

Geography 
Tiryan-Yelga is located 26 km northeast of Tuymazy (the district's administrative centre) by road. Kaznakovka is the nearest rural locality.

References 

Rural localities in Tuymazinsky District